Curt Franz Wenzel Christoph Erdmann Graf Zedtwitz von Moraván und Duppau (3 October 1822, in Asch – 19 November 1909, in Pressburg), Lord of Duppau in the Duppau Mountains with Sachsengrün in the Kingdom of Bohemia, and of Moraván with Duzó, Hubina, Nagy and Kis-Modó in the Kingdom of Hungary, was an Austrian-Hungarian-Bohemian military and nobleman.

Personal life 
By birth member of the House of Zedwitz, he was son of Count Sigmund Erdmann Wilhelm Friedrich von Zedtwitz (15 August 1778, in Asch – 7 July 1847, in Asch) and his second second wife (m. Schwarzbach, Thuringia, 26 July 1820) Emilie Friederike Henriette Ernestine von Einsiedel (2 July 1798, in Wolftitz – 12 July 1865, in Duppau, Duppau Mountains)..

Career 
He was a Gentleman of the Bedchamber and a Privy Councillor of the Emperor of Austria and a Lieutenant-Colonel of the Austro-Hungarian Army.

Marriage and children 
He married firstly in Weningen-Auma on 6 March 1849 Caroline Adelheid Ernestine von Schönberg (Hain, near Gera, 31 July 1826 – Schloss Moraván, 16 February 1894), daughter of Friedrich August von Schönberg and wife Caroline Christiane Freiin von Brandenstein, and had issue, among whom a daughter Alexandra Emilie Caroline Eugenie Henriette Adele Gräfin Zedtwitz von Moraván und Duppau (Schloss Duppau, 15 September 1861 – Schloss Arnsdorf, 26 July 1945), married in Dresden on 27 January 1885 with Heinrich Moritz Max Freiherr von Beschwitz (Otzdorf, 23 December 1859 – Schloss Arnsdorf, 22 July 1944), Lord of Arnsdorf with Gersdorf and Ottendorf in the Kingdom of Saxony, and had issue.

References 

1822 births
1909 deaths
People from Aš
People from the Kingdom of Bohemia
German Bohemian people
Bohemian nobility
Counts of Austria
Austrian politicians